Mihatovići may refer to:

 Mihatovići, Bosnia and Herzegovina, a village near Tuzla
 , a village near Poreč